Gastrotheca antomia is a species of frog in the family Hemiphractidae. It is endemic to Colombia and found on the western versant of the Cordillera Occidental in Antioquia, Risaralda, Chocó, and Valle del Cauca Departments, at elevations of  asl.

The natural habitat of Gastrotheca antomia is Andean cloud forest. It is threatened by habitat loss.

References

antomia
Amphibians of the Andes
Amphibians of Colombia
Endemic fauna of Colombia
Amphibians described in 1997
Taxa named by John Douglas Lynch
Taxonomy articles created by Polbot